Simone & Simaria (sometimes written as Simone e Simaria) was  a Brazilian musical duo consisting of Brazilian-born sisters Simone Mendes Rocha Diniz (born May 24, 1984 in Uibaí) and Simaria Mendes Rocha Escrig (born June 16, 1982 in Uibaí). In 2017, the duo's album competed in the category Latin Grammy Award for Best Sertaneja Music Album.

Discography

Studio albums 

Nã, Nã, Nim Na Não (2004)
As Coleguinhas - Vol. 1 (2012)
As Coleguinhas - Vol. 2 (2013)
As Coleguinhas - Vol. 3 (2014)
As Coleguinhas - Vol. 4 (2015)

Live albums 

Ao Vivo em Manaus (2013)
Bar das Coleguinhas (2015)
Live (2016)
Aperte o Play (2019)

References

Brazilian musical duos
Musical groups established in 2004
Musical groups reestablished in 2012
Universal Music Group artists
Latin pop music groups
Women in Latin music
Female musical duos